Rachel Kum (born 8 April 1985) is a Singaporean entrepreneur who co-founded the Singaporean company Rachel K Cosmetics. She is also a former beauty pageant participant who won Miss Singapore Universe 2009. She represented Singapore as a contestant in the Miss Universe 2009 pageant, which was held at the Atlantis Paradise Island, in Nassau, Bahamas on 23 August 2009.

Career
Born and raised in Singapore, Kum graduated from Finance at the University of Western Australia. She created her own cosmetic brand, Rachel K Cosmetics.

In 2009, Kum was featured in a Windows commercial on AXN Asia television.

References

External links
 Rachel K Cosmetics
 Miss Universe

Living people
Miss Universe 2009 contestants
Singaporean people of Chinese descent
University of Western Australia alumni
Singaporean beauty pageant winners
1985 births